Carlia storri, also known commonly as the brown bicarinate rainbow-skink or Storr's carlia, is a species of lizard in the family Scincidae. The species was first described by Glen Joseph Ingram and Jeanette Covacevich in 1989. It is native to the Australian state of Queensland and to Papua New Guinea.

Etymology
The specific name, storri, is in honour of Australian herpetologist Glen Milton Storr.

Habitat

Reproduction
Carlia storri is oviparous.

References

Further reading
Cogger HG (2014). Reptiles and Amphibians of Australia, Seventh Edition. Clayton, Victoria, Australia: CSIRO Publishing. xxx + 1,033 pp. .
Wilson, Steve; Swan, Gerry (2013). A Complete Guide to Reptiles of Australia, Fourth Edition. Sydney: New Holland Publishers. 522 pp. .

Carlia
Reptiles described in 1989
Skinks of Australia
Reptiles of Papua New Guinea
Taxa named by Glen Joseph Ingram
Taxa named by Jeanette Covacevich
Skinks of New Guinea